The 2007 Pep Boys Auto 500 was a stock car racing competition held on October 28, 2007, at Atlanta Motor Speedway in Hampton, Georgia. The race was the thirty-third race of the 2007 NASCAR Nextel Cup Series and the seventh of the season-ending ten-race Chase for the Nextel Cup.

To commemorate the fifteenth anniversary of the 1992 Hooters 500, the last race of the 1992 NASCAR Winston Cup Series, Jeff Gordon served as the Grand Marshal while Richard Petty served as the honorary flagman. Gordon had made his first career start in the 1992 race, which was also Petty's final race.

Background
Jeremy Mayfield replaced Jeff Green in the  66 Chevrolet for Haas CNC Racing.
Mike Skinner replaced Mayfield in the No. 36 Toyota for Bill Davis Racing.
 Burney Lamar, in the No. 08 car, attempted to make his first career Nextel Cup Series start.

Qualifying
With a lap of 28.807 seconds at a speed of 192.453 mph, Greg Biffle won his first pole position of the year. Former teammate Kurt Busch started alongside him. Dale Jarrett, in his final fall Atlanta race, had a season best third place starting spot. Spring race winner Jimmie Johnson started sixth, while championship leader, Jeff Gordon, started in the eighth. Tony Stewart, the defending race winner started the race in thirteenth.

Failed to Qualify: No. 00–David Reutimann, No. 4–Ward Burton, No. 06–Sam Hornish Jr., No. 08–Burney Lamar, No. 36–Mike Skinner

Notes

21-Bill Elliott was forced to use his third of six past champions provisional to make the field.
22-Dave Blaney had a suspension failure during his qualifying lap and did not post a speed.

Results

Sources:

Post-race
Jimmie Johnson's eighth victory of the 2007 season, combined with a seventh-place finish for Gordon, has compacted the points difference between the two down to nine points heading into Texas.
In the battle for the first thirty-five positions in owners points, due to the suspension failure of the No. 22 car, the Wood Brothers/JTG Racing No. 21 gains points, but was still 82 points out.
The top 2 finishers would be reversed in the next season's race, with Edwards winning and Johnson finishing second. Kenseth would also finish fourth yet again.

References

Pep Boys Auto 500
Pep Boys Auto 500
NASCAR races at Atlanta Motor Speedway
October 2007 sports events in the United States